Clement Edward Glenister  (23 July 1897 – 24 May 1968) was an English first-class cricketer and Royal Navy officer.

Glenister was born at Watford in July 1897 and was educated at Berkhamsted School. He joined the Royal Navy in the latter stages of the First World War, based at the admiralty, and in December 1919 he gained the rank of paymaster sub-lieutenant, antedated to September 1917. Glenister played first-class cricket for the Royal Navy, making his debut against the British Army cricket team at Lord's in 1924. He played first-class cricket for the Royal Navy until 1929, making five appearances. He scored a total of 104 runs in his five matches, at an average of 11.55 and a high score of 49. With his right-arm slow bowling, he took 9 wickets at a bowling average of 27.22 and best figures of 2 for 39. He was promoted to the rank of paymaster lieutenant commander in September 1927, with promotion to the rank of paymaster commander coming in June 1935. Glenister served in the Second World War, shortly after which he was promoted to the rank of captain and made an OBE in the 1946 Birthday Honours. Five years later in the 1951 Birthday Honours, he was made an CBE. During his final months of service he served as aide-de-camp to Elizabeth II, before retiring from active service in September 1952. He died in May 1968 at Bovingdon, Hertfordshire.

References

External links

1897 births
1968 deaths
Military personnel from Hertfordshire
People from Watford
People educated at Berkhamsted School
Royal Navy officers
Royal Navy personnel of World War I
English cricketers
Royal Navy cricketers
Royal Navy personnel of World War II
Commanders of the Order of the British Empire
Royal Navy logistics officers